The men's coxless pair competition at the 2000 Summer Olympics in Sydney, Australia took place at Sydney International Regatta Centre.

Competition format
This rowing event was a sweep event, meaning that each rower has one oar and rows on only one side. Two rowers crewed each boat, with no coxswain. The competition consists of multiple rounds. Finals were held to determine the placing of each boat; these finals were given letters with those nearer to the beginning of the alphabet meaning a better ranking. Semifinals were named based on which finals they fed, with each semifinal having two possible finals.

With 15 boats in with heats, the best boats qualify directly for the semi-finals. All other boats progress to the repechage round, which offers a second chance to qualify for the semi-finals. The best three boats in each of the two semi-finals qualify for final A, which determines places 1–6 (including the medals). Unsuccessful boats from semi-finals A/B go forward to final B, which determines places 7–12. The remaining three boats are automatically eliminated from the competition.

Schedule
All times are Australian Time (UTC+10)

Results

Heats
The first three finishers of each heat advanced to the semifinals, remainder goes to the repechage.

Heat 1

Heat 2

Heat 3

Repechage
First three qualify for semifinals A/B, the rest are eliminated.

Semifinals
First three qualify to Final A, remainder to Final B.

Semifinal 1

Semifinal 2

Finals

Final B
Held on 22 September 2000

Final A

References

External links
Official Report of the 2000 Sydney Summer Olympics
Rowing Results

Rowing at the 2000 Summer Olympics
Men's events at the 2000 Summer Olympics